William Adlington Cadbury (17 February 1867 – 8 July 1957), was an English businessman affiliated with his family company, Cadbury, which his grandfather, John Cadbury had founded. He was Lord Mayor of Birmingham in 1919-1921.

He was born in Edgbaston and educated at Quaker schools. He began working at Cadbury in 1887. In 1905, he commissioned the first Cadbury logo. In 1921, the Cadbury script logo was introduced, based on William Cadbury's signature.

Family
He married Emmeline H. Wilson in 1902 and they had six children: Hannah (1903), John (1905), Alan (1907), Constance (1910), Richard (1911) and Brandon (1915).

Death
He died at Bromsgrove, Worcestershire, aged 90.

References

English businesspeople
English Quakers
People from Edgbaston
1867 births
1957 deaths